Charles Journeycake (December 16, 1817 - January 3, 1894), was a Christian Indian chief of the Lenape. He visited Washington, D.C. 24 times on behalf of his people starting in 1854.
Founder of Linwood, Kansas.

References
 Encyclopedia of Oklahoma History and Culture - Journeycake, Charles
 The Indian Chief, Journeycake, By S. H. Mitchell, The Internet Archive
 Both Banks of the River, by Argye M. Briggs is a fictionalized biography of Chief Journeycake.

Native American leaders
Lenape people
1817 births
1894 deaths
19th-century Native Americans
American city founders